Stelios Kazantzidis (Greek: Στέλιος Καζαντζίδης; 29 August 1931 – 14 September 2001) was one of the most prominent Greek singers. A leading singer of Greek popular music, or Laïkó, he collaborated with many of Greece's foremost composers.

Biography 
Kazantzidis was born in Nea Ionia, in Athens, Greece. He was the first of two brothers born to Haralambos Kazantzidis (of Pontian roots from Ordu) and Gesthimani Kazantzidis, who was a Greek who came from the town of Alanya (known as Alaiya) (Greek Κορακήσιον Korakesion) in what is now southern Turkey and migrated to Greece as a result of the Greco-Turkish War (1919–1922). He was orphaned at the age of 13 when his father, a member of the Greek Resistance, was beaten to death by right-wing guerillas in 1947, during the Greek Civil War. This forced Kazantzidis into employment, working as a baggage-carrier at Omonia Square and then for an interstate bus company, as a seller of roasted chestnuts at open markets, and as a labourer at the Nea Ionia textile mills.

His life changed when the owner of a factory, which was located in the Perissos working district, gave him a guitar. He spent long hours playing music. He made his first public appearance at a Kifissia night club in the early 1950s and soon after, in July 1952, made his first studio recording at Columbia studios with a song entitled "I'm going for a swim" (Για μπάνιο πάω), written by Apostolos Kaldaras. It did not do well but he tried again, recording Giannis Papaioannou's "The suitcases" (Οι βαλίτσες) soon after. The song became the first of many hits and with his newfound popularity he began to make appearances in some of the biggest clubs of the time, like "Theios", "Mpertzeletos" and "Rosignol". With his career in full swing, Kazantzidis began to collaborate with some of the biggest names in Greek music, among them Manolis Chiotis, Manos Hadjidakis, Mikis Theodorakis, and Stavros Xarhakos.

A hallmark in his career – and an event of great importance for the musical scene of post-war Greece – was his cooperation with composer Vassilis Tsitsanis. Starting in 1956 it resulted in several new songs as well as reinterpretions of Tsitsanis older songs. Kazantzidis, thus, sung and popularized such rebetiko classics as "Synnefiasmeni Kyriaki", "Bakse tsifliki" and "Ta Kavourakia". These songs, and many others, previously unknown to the wide public suddenly became cherished and sought-after.

A few years later Kazantzidis started to develop his own musical style, a style with influences ranging from rebetika to Indian music. This new turn met with considerable success and became a template for later developments in Greek popular music. "Mantoubala" for example, a Kazantzidis original, was inspired by Madhubala, an Indian actress he saw. This was the first record in Greece to sell over 100,000 copies, an amazing fact since the total population of the country (at the time) was about 7.5 million.

Stelios Kazantzidis married Marinella on 7 May 1964 and they toured together in Germany and the United States. The two of them became a legendary duo. In 1965, Kazantzidis, whilst at the peak of his career, decided to stop appearing in nightclubs. For the next ten years, he only released studio albums. In September 1966 he divorced Marinella, and they recorded their last duets ("Mh Mou Lete Gia Authn", "Apopse Se Eho Stin Agalia Mou" and "I Kardia Tis Manas") for Philips the following year.

Following Marinella's departure Litsa Diamandi became his primary female harmony vocalist in 1968. The album simply titled Stelios Kazantzidis (often referred to as the "balloon album", due to its cover artwork), was a transitional album. Marinella sang on some songs (including "Pame Tsarka"-an updated version of Tsitsanis' "Bakse Tsifliki") and Diamandi on others (e.g. the big hit "Efiye Efiye").

In 1968, Kazantzidis recorded "Nyhterides Ki Arahnes", written by newcomer Hristos Nikolopoulos; the song became an immediate success. The follow-up to this album, Ena Gramma had a number of hits, which included "Sto Trapezi Pou Tha Pino", "Pare T' Ahnaria", "Tha Kopso to Telefono" and "Kai Oi Andres Klene" (men cry too). Marinella had an "answer back" to that latter song, by releasing "Oi Andres Den Klene" (men don't cry).

In 1973 he collaborated with songwriter Akis Panou and released an album with six songs, including one of his biggest hits, "I zoi mou oli", and in 1974 he recorded "Stin Anatoli", composed by Theodorakis. The next year he recorded another one of his biggest hits, "Iparho", penned by Pythagoras. Suddenly Kazantzidis rocked the Greek music industry again, when he announced his decision to stop recording. He accused his label of "colonial-like" contracts and took a leave from recording. In 1987 he recorded again for the first time after 12 years. "Ο Dromos Tis Epistrofis" (Ο Δρόμος της Επιστροφής) sold 200,000 copies and became a commercial success. He continued to release records occasionally for the rest of his life. Kazantidis, besides his work on folk music, also recorded four records with Pontic music alongside Chrysanthos Theodoridis, the greatest Pontic singer, songwriter, and lyricist.

Foreign audiences
In Israel, he was a musical icon. Many of his songs were translated into Hebrew and performed by the country's leading singers. Yaron Enosh, an Israel Radio broadcaster who often plays Greek music on his programs, described the singer's ability to combine joy with sorrow: "This is the task of music: to touch the entire range of feelings...Kazantzidis could do this; he played on all the strings." To the Greek Jews who immigrated to Israel, Kazantzidis was "the voice of the world they left behind, for good or for bad." According to the operator of Radio Agapi, a station that plays Greek music 24 hours a day, "Kazantzidis was the voice of the people, of the weary, the exploited, the betrayed. And the voice of the refugee and the emigre, too."

Kazantzidis also sang in Turkish.
His song Bekledim da Gelmedin (I waited and you didn't come) was constantly played on the radio after the events of Bloody Christmas (1963). This was done to taunt Turkish Cypriots who had been expecting military relief from Turkey that never came. 

In the 1970s/80s, many Greek recording artists, including Kazantzidis, had recordings issued by the New York-based P.I. (Peters International) label, for the Greek diaspora in the USA.

Minos also had Kazantzidis recordings issued in Israel, for the local market there.

Death
Kazantzidis died of a brain tumor on 14 September 2001. His death was an emotional event for Greece, as attested to by the many obituaries in appreciation of his life and work. Kazantzidis was given a state funeral through the streets of Elefsina (26 km from Athens) which was broadcast live on Greek television. His music was also beloved by the Greek diaspora all over the world, capturing their feelings in the difficult post-war period.

He was commemorated on a Greek postage stamp in 2010.

Film
Greek popular music had long been intertwined with Greek post-war cinema. In the 50s and 60s, almost every film contained portions of music performed on screen, often by Kazantzidis.

 I kyria dimarhos (1960) – Mrs Mayor
 Paixe, bouzouki mou glyko (1965) – Play, my sweet Bouzouki
 I timoria (1965) – The punishment
 Afiste me na ziso (1965) – Let me live
 Adistaktoi (1965) – The Ruthless
 Oi angeloi tis amartias (To limani) (1966) – Angels of sin
 Foukarades kai leftades (1966) – The unfortunate and the rich
 Eho dikaioma na s' agapo! (1966) – I have the right to love you
 O gerontokoros (1967) – The aged bachelor
 I ora tis dikaiosynis (1967) – The hour of justice
 Adiki katara (1967) – Unjust Curse
 Ta psihoula tou kosmou (1968) – The breadcrumbs of the world
 Oi andres den lygizoun pote! (1968) – Men never bend
 O gigas tis Kypselis (1968) – Kypseli's Giant
 Kravges ston anemo (1976) – Shouts in the wind

Two of his songs ("To Psomi tis Ksenitias" and "Ena Sidero Anameno" (Ένα σίδερο αναμένο)) are featured in Season 2 of the hit HBO TV series The wire, during the season's second-to-last episode, "Bad Dreams". The first is heard in the background of a restaurant while the second is heard in multiple of the final scenes of the episode; the music was not sourced anywhere on set, a technique rarely used by the show's producers.

"Epsahna Adika Na Vro" is audible in the Movie "Summer Lovers". However, it does not appear on the soundtrack album, nor is it in the film credits.

Discography

Albums
1961 – 1963
"Kazantzidis & Marinella – Megales Epitihies" (Great hits) 1964
"Chrysos Diskos Kazantzidi & Marinellas" / "Songs from the North American Tour" 1965 (Actually studio recordings of the songs they performed in the US/Canada. Taping of the Carnegie Hall show was planned but never occurred. Other tour stops were in Montreal, Toronto, Chicago, and Boston. No bootleg recordings of any of these concerts, are known to exist).
"Kazantzidis #3" (mid-1960s recordings on Odeon, not to be confused with another album, also called "#3" which is on Regal, and is a hits compilation)
"Tragoudise Mazi Mas" (Sing together) 1966
"Stelios Kazantzidis" (self-titled, "Balloon Cover" album) 1968
"Kazantzidis & Marinella" 1969
"Nichterides Ki' Arachnes" (Bats and spiders) 1969
"Ena Gramma" (One Letter) 1970
"I Stenahoria Mou"(My distress)1971
"Iparcho" (I exist) 1975
"I Gialinos Kosmos" (A World of Glass) 198?
"O Gyrismos" (The Return) 198?
"Elevtheros" (The Victor) 1988
"Stelios Kazantzidis & Marinella – Ta Tragoudia Tis Amerikis" (The songs of America) 1991
"Kai Pou Theos" 1994
"Synapanteman" 1994
"O Stelios Tragoudaei" (Stelios is singing) 2001–02
"Stelios Kazantzidis: Ta zeibekika" 2003

Appearances on Compilation albums
Retsina and Bouzouki No. 2 and #3(HMV, Greece)
Greek Serenade(Capitol, USA)....includes "Vraho Vraho ton Kaimo Mou" and "O Kyr-Antonis"
Nina "Custom Series"(Nina, USA)....late 1950s Greek hits compilation of various artists, spread through six discs—the first four have no Kazantzidis songs, but he appears on the last two, with "Tha Vro Moumouri Baglama" and "Enoho Chryma"...
The wire "...and all the pieces matter" with his theme "Efuge, efuge"

Singles
Notable Stelios Kazantzidis songs include:

I zoi mou oli – My entire life – 2:57
Dio Portes Echi i Zoi – Life has two doors – 3:20
To Agriolouloudo – The wildflower – 2:50
Allotines Mou Epoches – My former times – 2:43
Anemona – 3:00
De Tha Ksanagapiso – I will never love again – 3:10
As Eicha tin Ygeia Mou – If I had my health – 3:03
An Einai i Agapi Egklima – If love is a crime – 2:26
Ego me tin Axia Mou – Me with my worth – 3:15
Eimai Ena Kormi Chameno – I'm a lost man – 3:33
Exo Ap'Adiko – I have suffered injustice – 3:04
Gyrizo Ap'ti Nychta – I return from the night – 2:58
Tin Kalyva Ti Diki Mou – That hut of mine – 2:32
I Kardia Mou As Opsetai – Take a look at my heart – 3:16
Kathenas me ton Pono Tou – Each with his pain – 3:20
Katastrofes kai Symfores – Catastrophes and misfortunes – 3:45
Ki An Gello Einai Psema – And if I laugh, it's a lie – 3:24
Me Xypnas Charamata – You wake me at dawn – 2:40
Niotho mia Kourasi Vareia – I feel a deep weariness – 3:05
Nomiza Pos Itan Filoi – I thought that they were friends – 3:15Otan Methaei o Anthropos – When A man gets drunk – 2:46Pare ta Chnaria Mou – Take my footprints – 3:08I Stenochoria Mou – My concerns – 3:00Tha to Po Fanera – I'll say it openly – 3:24Sto Trapezi pou ta Pino – At the table where I drink – 2:37H Kypros einai Elliniki – Cyprus is Greek – 3:12Nea Ionia – Nea Ionia – 2:49Tha Kopso to Telefono- "I'll Break the Telephone"Klaio Kai Pono – "Crying and in Pain"''

Cover Versions and Related
Poly Panou "Tis Fthologias Tragoudi"("The Poor Peoples' Song")single written by Kazantzidis. He is on the B-side of the single, "Ap' To Pono Tha Pethano"
Christos Nikolopoulos....Bouzouki player for Kazantzidis in the 1970s/80s has solo recordings out.
Daviko......Israeli singer has an album called "Yassoo Kazantzidi". Songs are a mix of Greek and Hebrew.
"Efiye Efiye" has been sampled, and used in the songs by J Love("Track 19") and Action Bronson("Eastern Promises").
Zohar Argov, Israeli singer, had a local hit called "Elinor"---which is "Yparho" but with new lyrics written in Hebrew.
Dimitris Mitropanos, another famous Greek singer, had covered a Kazantzidis song, "Gyrizo Ap' Tin Nychta" TWICE.....both the studio and live versions became hits in Greece.

References

External links
Official fan community Stelios Kazantzidis
Who is Stelios Kazantzidis?, Trapezounta

Syllogos filon Stelios Kazantzidis

1931 births
2001 deaths
20th-century Greek male singers
Greek laïko singers
Greek rebetiko singers
PolyGram Records (Greece) artists
Minos EMI artists
Singers from Athens
Thessaloniki Song Festival entrants
Deaths from brain cancer in Greece
Burials at the First Cemetery of Athens